A cant is the jargon or language of a group, often employed to exclude or mislead people outside the group. It may also be called a cryptolect, argot, pseudo-language, anti-language or secret language. Each term differs slightly in meaning; their use is inconsistent.

Etymology
There are two main schools of thought on the origin of the word cant:

 In linguistics, the derivation is normally seen to be from the Irish word  (older spelling ), "speech, talk", or Scottish Gaelic . It is seen to have derived amongst the itinerant groups of people in Ireland and Scotland, who hailed from both Irish/Scottish Gaelic and English-speaking backgrounds, ultimately developing as various creole languages. However, the various types of cant (Scottish/Irish) are mutually unintelligible. The Irish creole variant is simply termed "the Cant". Its speakers from the Irish Traveller community know it as Gammon, while the linguistic community identifies it as Shelta.
 Outside Gaelic circles, the derivation is normally seen to be from Latin , "to sing", via Norman French . Within this derivation, the history of the word is seen to originally have referred to the chanting of friars, used in a disparaging way some time between the 12th and 15th centuries. Gradually, the term was applied to the singsong of beggars and eventually a criminal jargon.

Argot
An argot (from French argot  'slang') is a language used by various groups to prevent outsiders from understanding their conversations. The term argot is also used to refer to the informal specialized vocabulary from a particular field of study, occupation, or hobby, in which sense it overlaps with jargon.

In his 1862 novel Les Misérables, Victor Hugo refers to that argot as both "the language of the dark" and "the language of misery."

The earliest known record of the term argot in this context was in a 1628 document. The word was probably derived from the contemporary name , given to a group of thieves at that time.

Under the strictest definition, an argot is a proper language with its own grammatical system. Such complete secret languages are rare because the speakers usually have some public language in common, on which the argot is largely based. Such argots are lexically divergent forms of a particular language, with a part of its vocabulary replaced by words unknown to the larger public; argot used in this sense is synonymous with cant. Such systems are examples of argots , or "coded argots".

Specific words can go from argot into common speech or the other way. For example, modern French  'crazy, goofy', now common usage, originates in the  transformation of Fr.  'crazy'.

In the field of medicine, physicians have been said to have their own spoken argot, cant or slang, which incorporates commonly understood abbreviations and acronyms, frequently used technical colloquialisms, and much everyday professional slang (that may or may not be institutionally or geographically localized). While many of these colloquialisms may prove impenetrable to most lay people, few seem to be specifically designed to conceal meaning from patients (perhaps because standard medical terminology would usually suffice anyway).

Anti-language
The concept of the anti-language was first defined and studied by the linguist Michael Halliday, who used the term to describe the lingua franca of an anti-society. He defined an anti-language as a language created and used by an anti-society. An anti-society is a small, separate community intentionally created within a larger society as an alternative to or resistance of it. For example, Adam Podgórecki studied one anti-society composed of Polish prisoners; Bhaktiprasad Mallik of Sanskrit College studied another composed of criminals in Calcutta.

Anti-languages are developed by these societies as a means to prevent outsiders from understanding their communication, and as a manner of establishing a subculture that meets the needs of their alternative social structure. Anti-languages differ from slang and jargon in that they are used solely among ostracized social groups including prisoners, criminals, homosexuals, and teenagers. Anti-languages use the same basic vocabulary and grammar as their native language in an unorthodox fashion. For example, anti-languages borrow words from other languages, create unconventional compounds, or utilize new suffixes for existing words. Anti-languages may also change words using metathesis, reversal of sounds or letters (e.g. apple to elppa), or by substituting their consonants. Therefore, anti-languages are distinct and unique, and are not simply dialects of existing languages.

In his essay "Anti-Language", Halliday synthesized the research of Thomas Harman, Adam Podgórecki, and Bhaktiprasad Mallik to explore anti-languages and the connection between verbal communication and the maintenance of social structure. For this reason, the study of anti-languages is both a study of sociology and linguistics. Halliday's findings can be compiled as a list of nine criteria that a language must meet to be considered an anti-language:

 An anti-society is a society which is set up within another society as a conscious alternative to it.
 Like the early records of the languages of exotic cultures, the information usually comes to us in the form of word lists.
 The simplest form taken by an anti-language is that of new words for old: it is a language relexicalised.
 The principle is that of same grammar, different vocabulary.
 Effective communication depends on exchanging meanings which are inaccessible to the layperson.
 The anti-language is not just an optional extra, it is the fundamental element in the existence of the “second life” phenomenon.
 The most important vehicle of reality-maintenance is conversation. All who employ this same form of communication are reality-maintaining others.
 The anti-language is a vehicle of resocialisation.
 There is continuity between language and anti-language.

Examples of anti-languages include Cockney rhyming slang, CB slang, verlan, the grypsera of Polish prisons, thieves' cant, Polari, and possibly Bangime.

In popular culture
Anti-languages are sometimes created by authors and used by characters in novels. These anti-languages do not have complete lexicons, cannot be observed in use for linguistic description, and therefore cannot be studied in the same way that a language that is actually spoken by an existing anti-society would. However, they are still used in the study of anti-languages. Roger Fowler's "Anti-Languages in Fiction" analyzes Anthony Burgess's A Clockwork Orange and William S. Burroughs' Naked Lunch to redefine the nature of the anti-language and to describe its ideological purpose.

A Clockwork Orange is a popular example of a novel in which the main character is a teenage boy who speaks an anti-language called Nadsat. This language is often referred to as an argot, but it has been argued that it is an anti-language because of the social structure that it maintains through the social class of the droogs.

Regional usage of term 
In parts of Connacht in Ireland, Cant mainly refers to an auction typically on fair day ("Cantmen and Cantwomen, some from as far away as Dublin, would converge on Mohill on a Fair Day, ... set up their stalls ... and immediately start auctioning off their merchandise") and secondly means talk ("very entertaining conversation was often described as 'great cant'" or "crosstalk").

In Scotland, two unrelated creole languages are termed as "cant". Scottish Cant (a mixed language, primarily Scots and Romani with Scottish Gaelic influences) is spoken by Lowland Roma groups. Highland Traveller's Cant (or Beurla Reagaird) is a Gaelic-based cant of the Indigenous Highland Traveller population. The cants are mutually unintelligible.

The word has also been used as a suffix to coin names for modern-day jargons such as "medicant", a term used to refer to the type of language employed by members of the medical profession that is largely unintelligible to lay people.

Examples

 Adurgari, from Afghanistan
 Agbirigba, from Nigeria
 Äynu, from China
 Back slang, from London, United Kingdom
 Banjački, from Serbia
 Barallete, from Galicia, Spain
 Bargoens, from the Netherlands
 Bron from León and Asturias, Spain
 Beurla Reagaird, a Gaelic-based cant used by Highland Traveller community in Scotland
 Boontling from California
 Caló (Chicano), from the US/Mexican border
 Cockney Rhyming Slang, from London, United Kingdom
 Engsh, from Kenya
 Fala dos arxinas, from Galicia, Spain
 Fenya from Russia
 Gacería, from Spain
 Gayle language, from South African gay culture
 Gender transposition
 Germanía, from Spain
 Grypsera, from Poland
 Gumuțeasca, from Romania
 Gyaru-moji, from Japan
 Hijra Farsi, from South Asia, used by the hijra and kothi subcultures (traditional indigenous approximate analogues to LGBT subcultures)
 IsiNgqumo, from South Africa and Zimbabwe
 Iyaric, from Jamaica, used by adherents of Rastafari
 Javanais, from France
 Jejemon, from the Philippines
Jeringonza, from Spain
 Joual, from Quebec French
 Klezmer-loshn, from Eastern Europe
 Korean ginseng-harvester's cant, from Korea
 Leet (or 1337 speak), from internet culture
 Louchébem, from France
 Lóxoro, from Peru
 Lubunca, from Turkey, used by LGBT community.
 Lunfardo, from Argentina and Uruguay
 Martian language, to replace Chinese characters
 Meshterski, from Bulgaria
 Miguxês, from the emo, hipster subcultures of young netizens in Brazil
 Minderico, a sociolect or a secret language traditionally spoken by tailors and traders in Minde, Portugal.
 Nadsat, a fictional argot
 Nihali, from India
 Nyōbō kotoba, from Japan
 Padonkaffsky jargon (or Olbanian) from Runet, Russia
 Pig Latin
 Pitkernese
 Podaná, from Greece
 Pajubá, from Brazil a dialect of the gay subculture that uses African or African sounding words as slang, heavily borrowed from the Afro-Brazilian religions
 Polari, a general term for a diverse but unrelated groups of dialects used by actors, circus and fairground showmen, gay subculture, criminal underworld (criminals, prostitutes).
 Rotvælsk, from Denmark
 Rotwelsch, from Germany
 Rövarspråket, from Sweden
 Šatrovački, from the former Yugoslavia
 Scottish Cant a variant of Scots and Romani used by the Lowland Romani people in Scotland, United Kingdom
 Shelta, from the Irish Travellers community in Ireland
 Sheng from Kenya
 Spasell, from Italy
 Swardspeak (or Bekimon, or Bekinese), from the Philippines
 Thieves' cant (or peddler's French, or St Giles' Greek), from the United Kingdom
Tōgo, from Japan (a back slang)
 Totoiana, from Romania
 Tsotsitaal, from South Africa
 Tutnese, from the United States
 Verlan, from France
 Xíriga, from Asturias, Spain
 Zargari

Thieves' cant 
The thieves' cant was a feature of popular pamphlets and plays particularly between 1590 and 1615, but continued to feature in literature through the 18th century. There are questions about how genuinely the literature reflected vernacular use in the criminal underworld. A thief in 1839 claimed that the cant he had seen in print was nothing like the cant then used by gypsies, thieves and beggars. He also said that each of these used distinct vocabularies, which overlapped, the gypsies having a cant word for everything, and the beggars using a lower style than the thieves.

Ulti 
Ulti is a language studied and documented by Bhaktiprasad Mallik in his book Languages of the Underworld of West Bengal. Ulti is an anti-language derived from Bengali and used by criminals and affiliates. The Ulti word kodān 'shop' is derived from rearranging the letters in the Bengali word dokān, which also means 'shop'.

See also

 Code word (figure of speech)
 Code talker
 Costermonger
 Doublespeak
 Gibberish (language game)
 Jargon
 Lazăr Șăineanu, a Romanian who studied such languages
 Microculture
 Obfuscation
 Patois
 Rhyming slang
 Shibboleth

References

Secondary sources

Further reading
Halliday, M. A. K. (1976) "Anti-Languages". American Anthropologist 78 (3) pp. 570–584

External links

Language varieties and styles
 
Slang
Shibboleths
Linguistics terminology